Andrew Jackson High School of Advanced Technology, A Dedicated Magnet School is the oldest fully accredited high school in Duval County, Florida. It is located just north of downtown Jacksonville on Main Street (U.S. Highway 17). It opened in 1927, the same time as Riverside High School (Formerly Robert E. Lee High School). It was originally an all-white school, but the school became integrated in 1970. It is named for U.S. President Andrew Jackson, an important figure in the history of Florida, after whom the city of Jacksonville is also named.

Jackson has the city's oldest athletic rivalry with Riverside High School (formerly Robert E. Lee High School). For many years the football game was played in the Gator Bowl Stadium on Thanksgiving Day, and it was a major event for students and alumni of both schools. The girls varsity basketball team were 2007 Gateway Conference Champions, beating out Samuel W. Wolfson High School. They won this award three consecutive years.

Jackson is the only high school in Duval County with an off-campus football stadium. The stadium is located about three-fourths of a mile north of the campus on Main Street, adjacent to North Shore Elementary School. Prior to the construction of this facility the Tigers played their home football games at the Gator Bowl. 
 
In 2017 Andrew Jackson High School celebrated its 90th anniversary.

Academics
Andrew Jackson currently offers the following magnet academies for students: 

 Air Force Junior ROTC
 Cyber Security
 Early College Program
 Sports Medicine
 Video Game Design

Each magnet academy features a 4-year course progression to provide students with the fundamental skills to succeed in their chosen field.  Students are given opportunities to earn industry relevant certifications, participate in internships and job shadowing, take field trips, and enroll in rigorous courses focused on their academy of choice.

Notable alumni
 W. Haydon Burns - mayor of Jacksonville 1949–1965 and Governor of Florida 1965–1967
 Lou Ritter - mayor of Jacksonville 1965–1967
 Jake Godbold - mayor of Jacksonville 1978–1987
 Maxey Dell Moody, Jr. - business magnate
 Tommy Hazouri - mayor of Jacksonville 1987–1991
 Rocco Morabito - Pulitzer Prize-winning photographer.
 Robert Edward Femoyer - Medal of Honor recipient and  World War II Army Air Corps navigator
 Wanda Hendrix - 1940s Hollywood actress
 A. C. Lyles - long-time Hollywood producer
 Micah Ross - former wide receiver for the Jacksonville Jaguars 
 James Collins - former professional basketball player for the Los Angeles Clippers
 Dennis Yost - lead singer of 1960s pop group Classics IV
 Rita Coolidge - Grammy Award-winning singer
 Judy Canova - comedian
 Connie Haines - big-band singer
 Leon Washington - former NFL running back, assistant coach for the New York Jets
 T. Terrell Sessums -  Speaker of Florida House of Representatives and Chairman of the Florida Board of Regents.
 Jeron Harvey - Former Wide receiver for the Jacksonville Jaguars and current wide receiver for the Jacksonville Sharks.
 Professor Backwards - comedian with 23 performances on The Ed Sullivan Show.
 Jamon Gordon - Professional European basketball player
 Vernon Edwards - Former Professional AFL football player.

Notes

References
 

Educational institutions established in 1927
High schools in Jacksonville, Florida
Duval County Public Schools
Public high schools in Florida
Magnet schools in Florida
1927 establishments in Florida
Northside, Jacksonville